The Canadian National Class Z-1-a was a series of six electric locomotives built by General Electric for the Canadian Northern Railway in 1917. They were used in service through the Mount Royal Tunnel in Montreal until retirement in 1995, operating for 76 years, 7 months and 12 days.

They were classified as a Box-Cab model 0440-E-166-4-GE-228-A by General Electric, delivered new to the Canadian Northern Railway. They were very similar to 6 units built for the Butte, Anaconda and Pacific Railway, as was the electrification system.

They were given the following classification: Class: Z-1-a by the CNoR in 1919; CN continued to use the same classification after 1919. One unit, CN 6713, was retired in 1993 and was then cannibalized for spare parts to supply the remaining class Z-1-a locomotives. Another, CN 6712, was donated to the Town of Mount Royal, and was stored at that city's municipal garage pending selection of a suitable display site. Such a site was never found; the unit was cannibalized and scrapped in 2011.

Preservation 

Four locomotives were preserved.

 CNoR600/CNR9100/100/6710 — On Display outside AMT Deux-Montagnes Station in Deux-Montagnes, Quebec. Pulled together with 6711 the Last train.

 CNoR601/CNR9101/101/6711 — Preserved at Exporail in Delson, Quebec. Pulled together with 6710 the last train; also pulled first train into tunnel October 21, 1918.

 CNoR604/CNR9104/104/6714 — Preserved at the Connecticut Trolley Museum in East Windsor, Connecticut. Built in Canada, at Canadian General Electric, Peterborough, Ontario. from parts shipped there from Schenectady, New York.

 CNoR605/CNR9105/105/6715 — Preserved at the Canada Science and Technology Museum in Ottawa, Ontario. Built entirely in Canada, at Canadian General Electric, Peterborough, Ontario.

See also 

 Canadian National Class Z-4-a
 CN electric multiple unit

References

General Electric locomotives
Canadian Northern Railway
Canadian National Railway locomotives
Electric locomotives of Canada
Bo+Bo locomotives
Passenger locomotives